The Cook Islands women's national sevens rugby union team is Cook Islands national representative in Rugby sevens. They competed at the 2015 Oceania Women's Sevens Championship and qualified for the Olympic repechage after placing third. Cook Islands did not qualify for Rio 2016, however, they defeated Hong Kong 17 - 12 to win the bowl final.

Players

Previous squads 

Beniamina Koiatu
 Chrystal Leota
 Dayna Napa
 Jennifer Reu
 Margaret Nena
 Joan Isaaka
 Tari Arere
 Wairakau Greig
 Crystal Tamarua
 Ngatokotoru Akakua
 Kaiyah Atai
 Lydia Turua-Quedley

The 2019 team was managed by Opuramiti Samuel and coached by Friends Tairea.

Tournament History

Pacific Games

Oceania Women's Sevens

 Note:

References

Women's national rugby sevens teams
women
Rugby union sevens, women